Nikki Danielle Moore, also known as Nicole Hayden is an American actress. She is best known for her role as Jenna Sharpe on the sitcom comedy television show 8 Simple Rules.

Career 
Her first on-screen appearance was a small role as Ally in an episode of the comedy television series Even Stevens. In 2004, she joined the cast of the ABC show 8 Simple Rules, playing Jenna Sharpe. In 2010, she became somewhat of an Internet sensation after appearing as "Denise" in Taco Bell commercials. She had guest roles on the television shows C.S.I. (2002), How I Met Your Mother (2011), Mad Men (2013) and 90210 (2013). She had a lead role as Emily in romantic comedy film The Park Bench (2014). The film also earned her Jury Award for Best Actress in a Narrative Feature at Queens World Film Festival. She also appeared in episodes of Grey's Anatomy; Station 19; The Catch; Diary of a Wedding Planner; and One & Done.

She has been credited as Nikki Hayden, Nikki D. Hayden but is now known as Nicole Hayden. One reason she has changed her screen name various times is because the Screen Actors Guild only allows one individual to perform under one name, and there were conflicts with her previous screen names.

Filmography

References

External links

Living people
American television actresses
Year of birth missing (living people)
Place of birth missing (living people)
21st-century American women